Future Times Three is a 1944 novel by the French writer René Barjavel. It tells the story of two scientists who invent a substance which if swallowed allows a man to time travel. They travel to the future, where humanity has branched into different species with their own particular tasks. The book was published in English in 1958, translated by Margaret Sansone Scouten.

Future Times Three is the first novel to present the famous grandfather paradox of time travel.

Adaptation
The book was adapted into the 1982 film Le Voyageur imprudent. The film was directed by Pierre Tchernia and stars Jean-Marc Thibault and Thierry Lhermitte.

References

1944 science fiction novels
1944 French novels
French novels adapted into films
French science fiction novels
French-language novels
Novels by René Barjavel
Novels about time travel